John Martin (8 December 1921 - 31 December 2012) was a Tahitian soldier and linguist. After service in the Second World War, he went on to found the Tahitian Academy.

Biography

Martin was born and raised in Tahiti, where he studied at the Vienot school and obtained his elementary certificate. In September 1940 , aged 18, he enlisted in the expeditionary force founded by Captain Félix Broche, which would become the Pacific Battalion. Within its ranks, he rose through to the rank of master sergeant. He fought at the Battle of Bir Hakeim, in Tunisia, in Italy , then, from the summer of 1944 and the landing in Provence, he followed the rise of the 1st Free French Division as far as the Vosges.

He married in Paris in 1945 before returning to Tahiti with the other surviving volunteers of the Pacific Battalion, including one of his cousins, Walter Grand, president of the Territorial Assembly of French Polynesia from 1955 to 1958.

After the war, John Martin served from 1946 to 1950 in the Territory's Economic Affairs, before joining Radio Tahiti, where he became director of Tahitian language programs. He was official interpreter during Charles de Gaulle's 1956 and 1966 visits to French Polynesia. After three years spent in Paris as deputy to the head of the delegation of French Polynesia, from 1962 to 1965, he joined the government of the territory as chief of staff.

A fervent defender of the Tahitian language and culture, he was one of the founders, in 1972, of the Tahitian Academy. He translated The Little Prince into Tahitian.

In January 1997 he was appointed a commander of the Order of Tahiti Nui.

Evolution in rank

 2nd class : 9 September 1940
 Corporal: January 21, 1941
 Master Corporal: July 14, 1941
 Sergeant: October 25, 1941
 Staff Sergeant: October 18, 1944

Honors

  Knight of the Legion of Honor (1972)
  Médaille militaire
  Croix de guerre (1939–1945)
  Resistance Medal
  Commander of the Order of Tahiti Nui (1997)
  Colonial Medal
  Croix de guerre des théâtres d'opérations extérieures
  Commemorative medal for voluntary service in Free France

References

1921 births
2012 deaths
People from Papeete
French Polynesian civil servants
French Army personnel of World War II
Members of the Tahitian Academy
Commanders of the Order of Tahiti Nui
Chevaliers of the Légion d'honneur
Recipients of the Croix de Guerre 1939–1945 (France)
Recipients of the Croix de guerre des théâtres d'opérations extérieures
Recipients of the Médaille militaire (France)